Van Petten may refer to:
Van Petten, Illinois, unincorporated community in the United States, named for A. G. Van Petten
John B. Van Petten (1827-1908), American educator, general and politician